The Men's 5 km competition of the 2022 European Aquatics Championships will be held on 20 August.

Competition was delayed from 18 to 20 August due to extreme weather affecting water conditions.

Results
The race was started at 10:00.

References

2022 European Aquatics Championships